Professor Lihadh Al-Gazali MBChB MSc FRCP FRCPCH is a professor in clinical genetics and paediatrics.  Her main area of interest is identifying new inherited disorders in Arab populations clinically and at the molecular level.

Biography
Al-Gazali was born in November 1950 in Amarah, Iraq, and raised in Baghdad. Her mother was an educationalist and her father an Army judge in Baghdad. She received higher education in UK.

Al-Gazali studied medicine at the University of Iraq in Baghdad. She received her Bachelor of Medicine, Bachelor of Surgery from Baghdad Medical College in 1973. She married and had a child before moving to the United Kingdom in 1976 to study paediatrics and clinical genetics. She continued her education in Leeds and Edinburgh, living and practicing until 1990. She then moved to Al Ain, becoming an assistant professor at the Department of Paediatrics of United Arab Emirates University. She played a role in establishing the Centre for Arab Genomic Studies. In 1995 she set up the first registry for birth defects in the UAE. This registry was the first birth defects registry in an Arab country and the first to become a member of the International Clearing House of Birth Defects in Rome, Italy. She became an associate professor in 1997.

She founded the first Clinical Genetics Service in the UAE, which offers support and counselling for families affected by congenital disorders. She has published over 240 scientific papers.

Al-Gazali received the Distinguished Performance Award in Research and Clinical Services of UAE University in 2003. In 2008 she received a L'Oréal-UNESCO Award for Women in Science "for her contributions to the characterization of inherited disorders." She also was awarded the Sheikh Hamdan Award for medical sciences which honours distinguished individuals working in medicine. In 2014 she was awarded the Takreem Award for Scientific and Technological achievement. In 2016, Professor Al-Gazali received the Abu Dhabi Award for service in clinical genetics and research.

Personal life
Professor Al-Gazali is married to Wessam Shather and has two daughters and a son.

Selected publications

References

Living people
Emirati biologists
Emirati women scientists
Iraqi geneticists
Iraqi scientists
Iraqi women scientists
People from Baghdad
Academic staff of United Arab Emirates University
Women geneticists
L'Oréal-UNESCO Awards for Women in Science laureates
21st-century women scientists
Year of birth missing (living people)